Hey, Mr. Producer! was a concert honoring theatre producer Cameron Mackintosh, performed in June 1998 as a benefit for the Royal National Institute of the Blind (RNIB) and the Combined Theatrical Charities.

Staged by Bob Avian, it was presented at the Lyceum Theatre in London on 7 – 8 June 1998, with the latter being a Royal Charity Gala in the presence of Queen Elizabeth II and the Duke of Edinburgh.

It featured performances from many of the hit musicals that Mackintosh has produced, including My Fair Lady, Oliver!, Little Shop of Horrors, The Fix, Godspell, Anything Goes, Song and Dance, The Boy Friend, Lauder, Five Guys Named Moe, Martin Guerre, Miss Saigon, The Phantom of the Opera, Follies, Oklahoma!, Carousel, Tom Foolery, Cats and Les Misérables, as well as a segment devoted to the work of Stephen Sondheim.

The show was hosted by Julie Andrews and the all-star cast performing these numbers included Tal Landsman, Liz Robertson, Jonathan Pryce, John Barrowman, Ellen Greene, Julian Lloyd Webber, Bernadette Peters, Patti Lupone, Russ Abbot, Sonia Swaby, David Campbell, Maria Friedman, Lea Salonga, Lisa Vroman, Colm Wilkinson, Michael Ball, Julia McKenzie, Hugh Jackman, Joanna Riding, Millicent Martin, David Kernan, Ruthie Henshall, Judi Dench, Tom Lehrer, Hal Fowler, Elaine Paige, Philip Quast, Adam Searles, Tee Jaye Jenkins, Trent Kendall, Monroe Kent III, Jason Pennycooke, Maria Charles, Richard D. Sharp and Feruma Williams.  There was also a special performance by Stephen Sondheim and Andrew Lloyd Webber, who spoofed their own songs. Some of the songs from less successful Mackintosh shows were also a part of the performance, but not contained in the DVD or CD of the event, including songs from Moby Dick! The Musical.

The concert was filmed and recorded and has been released on CD, DVD and videotape.

Song List

Act One
 We Said We Wouldn't Look Back (from "Salad Days")
 Overture (from "Cats")
 Food Glorious Food (from "Oliver!")
 My Fair Lady: Wouldn't It Be Loverly
 Quit Professor Higgins
 The Rain in Spain
 Get Me to the Church On Time
 I've Grown Accustomed to Her Face
 Introduction (Julie Andrews)
 One Two Three (from "The Fix")
 Little Shop of Horrors (from "Little Shop Of Horrors")
 Somewhere That's Green (from "Little Shop Of Horrors")
 Suddenly Seymour (from "Little Shop Of Horrors")
 Day by Day (from "Godspell")
 I Get a Kick Out of You (from "Anything Goes")
 Variations (from "Song & Dance")
 Unexpected Song (from "Song & Dance")
 Nicer in Nice (from "The Boy Friend")
 I Love a Lassie (from "Lauder")
 Five Guys Named Moe / Is You Is Or Is You Ain't My Baby?
 Oliver!: Pick a Pocket
 As Long as He Needs Me
 Introduction (Julie Andrews)
 Martin Guerre: I'm Martin Guerre
 How Many Tears?
 Miss Saigon: The Heat Is On in Saigon
 The Wedding
 The Last Night of the World
 This Is the Hour
 American Dream
 The Phantom of the Opera: The Phantom of the Opera
 Music of the Night
 All I Ask of You (Reprise)

Act Two
 Broadway Baby (from "Follies")
 Oh, What a Beautiful Mornin' (from "Oklahoma!")
 Carousel: Carousel Waltz / Ballet
 Porch Scene
 You'll Never Walk Alone
 Introduction to the Sondheim section (Ned Sherrin)
 Company: Side by Side
 You Could Drive a Person Crazy
 Send in the Clowns (from "A Little Night Music")
 Losing My Mind (from "Follies")
 Being Alive (from "Company")
 You've Gotta Have a Gimmick (from "Gypsy")
 Introduction (Stephen Sondheim)
 Duelling Pianos - Sondheim and Lloyd Webber
 Poisoning Pigeons in the Park (from "Tom Foolery")
 Cats: Jellicle Songs
 Memory
 Les Misérables: At the End of the Day
 I Dreamed a Dream
 Stars
 Do You Hear the People Sing?
 On My Own
 Bring Him Home
 One Day More
 Finale - Old Friends (from Merrily We Roll Along) Entire Company

References

External links
Listing at allmovie.com
Archive page for Hey, Mr. Producer!
Review, The London Theatre Guide, 7 June 1998

Hey Mr. Producer!